D. africanus may refer to:
 Dimorphognathus africanus, a frog species
 Ditylenchus africanus, the peanut pod nematode, a plant pathogenic species

See also
 Africanus (disambiguation)